The White Ribbon Alliance India (WRAI) is a nonpartisan, non-profit and non-governmental membership organization that operates as an alliance convening many partners at the global, national and sub-national levels. Originally established in 1999 as White Ribbon Alliance for Safe Motherhood, the Alliance primarily focused on ending maternal mortality and improving maternal and newborn health. Today, White Ribbon Alliance is driving progress on specific targets of Sustainable Development Goals 3 (health) and 5 (gender equality). 

White Ribbon Alliance is a registered 501(c)(3) in the United States with an extensive network of Alliances and members around the world, including National Alliances in Bangladesh, India, Indonesia, Kenya, Malawi, Mexico, Nepal, Nigeria, Pakistan, Uganda, United Kingdom, and Zimbabwe.

Mission and Vision
We envision a world where all girls and women realize their right to quality health and well-being. Our mission of activating a people-led movement for reproductive, maternal and newborn health and rights accelerates progress by putting citizens at the center of global, national and local efforts.

References

External links
 Official website
 On Twitter
 On Youtube

Maternal health
Health advocacy groups